"The Valley of the Pagans" is a song by British virtual band Gorillaz featuring Beck. The track was released on 5 November 2020 as the ninth and final single for Gorillaz' seventh studio album, Song Machine, Season One: Strange Timez, and the eighth episode of the Song Machine project, a web series which involves the ongoing release of various Gorillaz tracks featuring different guest musicians over the course of 2020.

Background
The demo version of the song, titled "West Hollywood", was leaked on 2 August 2020. It was recorded at Damon Albarn's home studio in Devon, England in 2020 during the COVID-19 pandemic.

Music video
The video, directed by Jamie Hewlett, Tim McCourt, and Max Taylor, opens up in the Kong Studios garage where Noodle is driving a similar car from the "Stylo" music video, but a portal opens up behind them and Noodle backs up into it. The portal transports the band into Grand Theft Auto V where Noodle speeds down various streets in the game. Beck appears in a smartphone seen on the bottom right of the screen and 2-D is shown talking to him in the back seat of the car. The video ends with the band driving through another portal that sends the car crashing into the ocean at Point Nemo, where Plastic Beach remains.

The music video on the band's YouTube page was taken down five days after it premiered. An alternative version of the video without the Grand Theft Auto V footage was uploaded in its place on 9 March 2021.

Track listing

Personnel
Gorillaz
 Damon Albarn – vocals, instrumentation, director, keyboards, bass, guitar, drum programming
 Jamie Hewlett – artwork, character design, video direction
 Remi Kabaka Jr. – drum programming

Additional musicians and personnel
 Beck – vocals 
 Rudy Albarn – drums, percussion 
 David Greenbaum – engineering
 Dylan Herman – engineering
 Stephen Sedgwick – mixing engineer, engineering
 Samuel Egglenton – engineering
 John Davis – mastering engineer

References

2020 songs
2020 singles
Gorillaz songs
Beck songs
Funk rock songs
British disco songs
Songs written by Damon Albarn
Songs written by Remi Kabaka Jr.
Songs written by Beck
Parlophone singles
Warner Records singles
Song Machine